Mycena lacrimans is a species of agaric fungus in the family Mycenaceae.  Found in South America, the fruit bodies of the fungus are bioluminescent.

See also
List of bioluminescent fungi

References

lacrimans
Bioluminescent fungi
Fungi described in 1989
Fungi of South America
Taxa named by Rolf Singer